Nalin Perera (born 21 January 1994) is a Sri Lankan cricketer. He made his first-class debut for Galle Cricket Club in the 2016–17 Premier League Tournament on 13 January 2017. He made his List A debut for Galle District in the 2016–17 Districts One Day Tournament on 22 March 2017.

References

External links
 

1994 births
Living people
Sri Lankan cricketers
Galle Cricket Club cricketers
Galle District cricketers
Cricketers from Colombo